Aoi may refer to:

 Ao (color), a Japanese color word (noun)
Aoi (name), a Japanese given name and a Japanese surname
Aoi, the Japanese name for various plants used in Japanese heraldry, including the hollyhock and wild ginger
Aoi, a shorthand for the Tokugawa clan which took the plant as its symbol
Aoi Matsuri, a hollyhock festival that takes place annually on 15 May in Kyoto, Japan
Aoi (trigraph), the three letters "aoi"
Aoi-ku, Shizuoka, a ward of Shizuoka, Shizuoka Prefecture, Japan

Science and technology 
 AND-OR-Invert, a Boolean logic gate in electrical engineering
 Angle of incidence (disambiguation), angle from "straight on" (angle from perpendicular or normal)
 Arctic oscillation index, a measure of atmospheric pressure changes in the Arctic
 Automated optical inspection, manufacturing test system that uses optical vision to identify defects during the manufacturing of a PCBoard
 Area of interest, a contiguous area that is of interest for military purposes, related to area of responsibility

Organizations 
 Arab Organization for Industrialization, an Egyptian defense manufacturing consortium
 Association of Illustrators, a non-profit trade association for illustrator's rights and professional standards (U.K.)
 AOI Records, a record label created by De La Soul
 Africa Orientale Italiana, an Italian colony in Africa
 Association of the Oldest Inhabitants of the District of Columbia, a civic organization based in Washington, D.C.

Other uses 
 "Aoi" (song), a 2013 song by Sakanaction
 Aoi (TV series), a 2000 Japanese historical drama television series 
 Ancona Airport's IATA code, near Ancona, Italy
 All Ordinaries, the primary index of the Australian securities market
 Articles of incorporation, the rules governing a corporation (U.S. and Canada)
 Art Official Intelligence, a series of albums by De La Soul